Somerset is a residential neighbourhood in the southwest quadrant of Calgary, Alberta, Canada. It is located at the southern edge of the city, north of Stoney Trail and east from the community of Bridlewood and west from Macleod Trail. The Spruce Meadows equestrian facility is located immediately southwest.

Somerset is represented in the Calgary City Council by the Ward 13 councillor.

Demographics
In the City of Calgary's 2016 municipal census, Somerset had a population of  living in  dwellings.

Residents in this community had a median household income of $88,150 in 2000, and there were 6.6% low income residents living in the neighbourhood. As of 2000, 23.1% of the residents were immigrants. A proportion of 10.8% of the buildings were condominiums or apartments, and 4.8% of the housing was used for renting.

Education
The community is served by the Somerset School (K-4) public school, and Samuel W. Shaw School (5-9). Both of these schools are run by the Calgary Board of Education. Bishop O'Byrne High School, which is run by the Calgary Catholic School District, is also readily accessible to Somerset residents.

Transit 
Somerset is served by Calgary Transit Routes 14 and 52. The Somerset-Bridlewood CTrain Station serves Somerset

See also
List of neighbourhoods in Calgary

References

External links
Somerset - Bridlewood Community Association

Neighbourhoods in Calgary